Aristidis Lottas (born 16 September 1988) is a Greek professional footballer who plays as a midfielder.

Career
Lottas began playing football in Olympiacos' youth teams. He also played for Bulgarian A PFG club Lokomotiv Mezdra.

Honours
Olympiacos Volos
Gamma Ethniki: 2018–19

References

External links
 
Profile at epae.org
Onsports Profile
Myplayer Profile

1988 births
Living people
Greek footballers
Greek expatriate footballers
Greek expatriate sportspeople in Bulgaria
Expatriate footballers in Bulgaria
First Professional Football League (Bulgaria) players
Olympiacos F.C. players
Chaidari F.C. players
PFC Lokomotiv Mezdra players
Paniliakos F.C. players
A.O. Kerkyra players
Korinthos F.C. players
Doxa Kranoula F.C. players
Olympiacos Volos F.C. players
Association football midfielders
Footballers from Ioannina